Kiyomi Kato may refer to
Kiyomi Kato (volleyball) (born 1953), Japanese volleyball player
Kiyomi Kato (wrestler) (born 1948), Japanese wrestler